Gertrudis is a feminine given name. People with that name include:

Gertrudis Bocanegra (1765–1817), who fought in the Mexican War of Independence
 Gertrudis de la Fuente (1921–2017), Spanish biochemist
Gertrudis Echenique (1849–1928), First Lady of Chile between 1896 and 1901
Gertrudis Gómez de Avellaneda (1814–1873), 19th century Cuban born writer who lived in Spain
Maria Gertrudis "Tules" Barceló (1800–1852), saloon owner and gambler in New Mexico
Santa Gertrudis (disambiguation)